Hugli-Chuchura or Hooghly-Chinsurah is a city and a municipality of Hooghly district in the Indian state of West Bengal. It lies on the bank of Hooghly River, 35 km north of Kolkata. It is located in the district of Hooghly and is home to the district headquarters. Chuchura houses the Commissioner of the Burdwan Range. It is a part of the area covered by Kolkata Metropolitan Development Authority (KMDA). The District Court building of Chinsurah is the longest building in West Bengal.

Chinsurah is the home to the new state-of-the-art 1000 KW DRM transmitter of Prasar Bharti which enables 'Akashvaani Maitree' to be broadcast across Bangladesh. This special Bangla service of All India Radio was launched in the wake of the Bangladesh Liberation Movement and played a key role during the war, broadcasting Indian news bulletins in Bangladesh. It continued till April 2010 but was discontinued thereafter due to decommissioning of the Super Power Transmitter at Chinsurah. The headquarters of the Hooghly District Sports Association (HDSA) and the famous district Sadar hospital Imambara Sadar Hospital is situated here. Chinsurah is also the home of the oldest Armenian church in India and old Hindu Temples.

Etymology

Hooghly-Chuchura was a municipality formed by the merging of two towns, Hugli and Chinsura, in 1865. The names are spelled in other ways including Hooghly, Hugli, Hughli, Ugulim (in Portuguese), Chinsura, Chunchura, Chuchro and Chinsurah.

State Highway 6/ Grand Trunk Road (G.T. Road) passes through the town. Chuchura and Hooghly are historic stations on the Howrah-Bardhaman main line of the Eastern Railway. Ferry services across the Hooghly River serves as a link with the district of North 24 Parganas.

History

The Portuguese founded the town of Hooghly-Chuchura in 1579, but the district has thousands of years of heritage in the form of the great kingdom of Bhurshut. The city flourished as a trading port and some religious structures were built. One such structure is a Christian church dedicated to a statue of Mary, brought by the Portuguese.

In 1629, political disorder struck the city and the Mughal governor of Bengal expelled the Portuguese. The fleeing Portuguese lost the statue in the river, but local people later found it on the river bank. The arrested Portuguese were taken to Delhi, where a death sentence of trampling by elephants was decreed. When the emperor Shah Jahan heard this he ordered the priests released and granted a piece of land on the bank of the river Hooghly, where the statue of Mary was reestablished. There the Portuguese constructed a church to house the statue, which still receives pilgrims today. The church was renovated in the 1980s and has been declared as a basilica by the authority of Rome.

After the Portuguese expulsion, the town was made the royal port of Bengal, and all the public offices and records were established there. In 1640 the East India Company established a factory at Hugli, their first settlement in Lower Bengal.

In 1656 the Dutch also erected a factory on the site of the town. At that time Calcutta was the principal settlement in Dutch Bengal, who used it as a base for Dutch intra-Asian trade in opium, saltpetre, spices, cotton and indigo. However, in 1685, a dispute having taken place between the English factors and the nawab, the town was bombarded and burned to the ground.

In 1759 the Dutch garrison of Chinsura, on its march to Chandernagore, attacked a British force under Colonel Forde. The Battle of Chinsurah lasted less than half an hour and ended with the rout of the Dutch attackers. In 1795, during the Napoleonic Wars, a British garrison occupied the settlement. The peace of 1814 restored Hughli to the Dutch. However, in 1825, the Dutch ceded many of their possessions in India to the British, in exchange for the British-occupied possessions in Sumatra.

Both Chinsurah and Hooghly played a role in the Bengal renaissance and the Indian independence movement. "Vande Mataram", India's national song, was composed by Bankim Chandra Chattopadhyay at Joraghat in Chinsurah, who had been an alumnus of the Hooghly Collegiate School. Nazrul Islam's revolutionary songs were penned while he was imprisoned by the colonial government in Hooghly Jail (Hooghly District Correctional Home).

Geography

Location

This city is on the flood plain on the right bank of river Bhagirathi-Hooghly.
The area is composed of flat alluvial plains that forms part of the Gangetic Delta. The high west bank of the tidal Hooghly River is highly industrialised.

Keota, Manushpur, Naldanga, Kodalia, Kulihanda, Dharampur and Simla form a cluster of census towns on the eastern side of Hugli-Chuchura.

Urbanisation
There are 13 statutory towns and 64 census towns in Hooghly district. The right bank of the Hooghly River has been industrialised over a long period. With foreigners dominating the area's industry, trade and commerce for over two centuries, it is amongst the leading industrialised districts in the state. At the same time the land is fertile and agricultural production is significant.

In Chinsurah subdivision 68.63% of the population is rural and the urban population is 31.37%. It has 2 statutory and 23 census towns. In Chinsurah Mogra CD Block 64.87% of the population is urban and 35.13% is rural. Amongst the four remaining CD Blocks in the subdivision two were overwhelmingly rural and two were wholly rural.

The map alongside shows a portion of Chinsurah subdivision. All places marked in the map are linked in the larger full screen map.

Transportation

Hooghly-Chinsurah has three railway stations: Chinsurah railway station (CNS), Hooghly railway station (HGY) and Bandel Junction railway station (BDC) on the Howrah line and Hooghly Ghat railway station (HYG) on the Sealdah line. Thus Chinsurah is well connected to Howrah, Burdwan, Katwa, Naihati and other cities. A few passenger and express trains stop at the Chuchura station. The Hooghly Ghat station is beside the Sampreeti Bridge which is a connector between the eastern and the western side of the Ganges.

Transportation in Chinsurah is mainly covered by bus, auto, rickshaw and toto. Private Buses from Chinsurah Court stand go to Chinsurah railway station (Bus no. 1) and other towns such as Dakshineswar (Bus no. 2), Memari (Bus no. 4), Jirat (Bus no. 8), Tarakeswar (Bus no. 17 and 23), Haripal (Bus no. 18) and Pandua (Bus no. 39). Besides Express Buses up to Bankura, Jangipara etc. are also available. Formerly bus to Arambagh, Bandar, Bardhaman, Barakar, Digha, Laugram, Kumarganj was available but due to insufficient passengers many of them are completely closed while some are short terminated and originated at Tarakeswar. According to many passengers because of so many illegal auto and toto routes, bus routes are closing. Auto service is provided to nearby towns and villages. Chinsurah Court-Chinsurah Railway Station, Chinsurah Court-Tribeni, Chinsurah Court-Bandel Junction Railway Station, Chinsurah Court-Hooghly railway station are the major auto routes in Hooghly-Chinsurah. Additionally, Chinsurah is well-connected to Naihati by ferry services.

Demographics
As per 2011 Census of India Hugli-Chinsurah had a total population of 179,931 of which 90,217 (50%) were males and 89,714 (50%) were females. Population below 6 years was 12,604. The total number of literates in Hugli-Chinsurah was 152,333 (91.04% of the population over 6 years).

The following Municipalities and Census Towns in Hooghly district were part of Kolkata Urban Agglomeration in 2011 census: Bansberia (M), Hugli-Chinsurah (M), Bara Khejuria (Out Growth), Shankhanagar (CT), Amodghata (CT), Chak Bansberia (CT), Naldanga (CT), Kodalia (CT), Kulihanda (CT),  Simla (CT), Dharmapur (CT), Bhadreswar (M), Champdani (M), Chandannagar (M Corp.), Baidyabati (M), Serampore (M), Rishra (M), Rishra (CT), Bamunari (CT), Dakshin Rajyadharpur (CT), Nabagram Colony (CT), Konnagar (M), Uttarpara Kotrung (M), Raghunathpur (PS-Dankuni) (CT), Kanaipur (CT) and Keota (CT).

 India census, Hugli-Chinsurah had a population of 170,201. Males constitute 51.06% of the population and females 48.94%. Hugli-Chinsurah has an average literacy rate of 82.55%, higher than the national average of 74.04%: male literacy is 87.93% and female literacy is 76.95%.

Police stations
Chinsurah police station has jurisdiction over Hugli-Chuchura and Bansberia Municipal areas and a part of Chinsurah Mogra CD Block. Chinsurah police station has jurisdiction by Chandannagar Police Commissionerate. Chinsurah has a woman police station.

Education

Primary and secondary education

Hooghly Collegiate School (established 1812), boys, Bengali language
Hooghly Branch Government School (established in 1834)
 Techno India Group Public School, Hooghly (established 2005), co-ed, English Medium School
 Don Bosco School, Bandel (established 1978), boys, English Medium School
 Chinsurah Deshbandhu Memorial High School, boys, Bengali Medium School
 Auxilium Convent School, Bandel, girls, English Medium School
 Chinsurah Duff High School (established 1849)
 Binodini Girls High School
 S.C. Shome Training Academy
 Chinsurah Balika Sikha Mandir
 Chinsurah Deshbandhu Memorial High School (Boys)
 Chinsurah Deshbandhu Memorial High School (Girls)
 Chinsurah Bharati Bidya Bhavan Girls High School
 Garbati High School
 Hooghly Girls High School
 Hooghly Balika Banga Vidyalaya
 Ghutia Bazar Mattickbati Pathsala
 Sahaganj Shayaprosad Jatiya Vidyalaya
 Hooghly Jyotish Chandra Vidyapith (Boys)
 Chinsurah Balika Banimandir
 Bandel St.John’s High School
 Gourhari Harijan Vidyalaya
 Haronath Niroda Sundari Ghosh Vidyalaya
 Mearberh Ramkrishna Sikha Niketa
 Hooghly Jyotish Chandra Ghosh Balika Vidyalaya
 Elite Co-Ed
 Hooghly Deaf & Dumb School
 Abbot Sishu Hall
 Chinsurah English School

Higher-education
 Hooghly Engineering and Technology College
 Hooghly Institute of Technology
 West Bengal Survey Institute
 Hooghly Mohsin College 
 Hooghly Women's College
 Techno India Hooghly
 Technic Polytechnic Institute

Festivals

Durga Puja, Jagadhatri Puja, Kartick Puja, Kali Puja & Deepawali, Ras Yatra, Saraswati Puja, Lakshmi Puja, Navabarsho (Bengali New Year), Basanti Puja, Manasa Puja, etc. are the main festivals celebrated here. Jagadhatri Puja or Mohish Mordini puja is a  very famous festival. Every year it starts from "Jamai Sasti" and continues till 4days like Durga Puja. Mohish Mordini temple is situated in Dharampur. The famous Gajan Festival is also celebrated at Sandeswartala Temple in Chinsurah near the bank of river Hooghly.

Notable people
 Muhammad Mohsin – Bengali philanthropist 
Sarat Chandra Chattopadhyay – Bengali writer
Bhudev Mukhopadhyay – Bengali writer and intellectual
Kalikananda Abadhuta – novelist 
Bankim Chandra Chattopadhyay – novelist (wrote the national song of India)
Bijoy Modak – freedom fighter

See also

 Colonial India
 Dutch Cemetery, Chinsurah
 Dutch India
 European colonies in India
 Hooghly Chinsurah Municipality

References

Bibliography
 Dey, S. C., "Hooghly Past and Present", The Calcutta Review,  Vol.96, No.191, (January 1893), pp.22-42; No.192, (April 1893), 276-288; Vol.97, No.193, (July 1893), pp.71-81; No.194, (October 1893), 340-366;Vol.98, No.195, (January 1894), pp.152-170; Vol.99, No.197, (July 1894), pp.153-164; Vol.104, No.208, (April 1897), pp.355-373.

External links

 Dutch in Chinsurah 
 Hoogly Chinsurah Municipality

Former Portuguese colonies
Dutch India
Cities and towns in Hooghly district
Neighbourhoods in Kolkata
Kolkata Metropolitan Area
Cities in West Bengal